Wilderness Mail is a 1935 American adventure film directed by Forrest Sheldon and written by Bennett Cohen and Robert Dillon. The film stars Kermit Maynard, Fred Kohler, Paul Hurst, Doris Brook, Syd Saylor and Dick Curtis. The film was released on March 9, 1935, by Ambassador Pictures.

Plot

Cast           
Kermit Maynard as Rance Raine / Keith Raine
Fred Kohler as Lobo McBain / Landau
Paul Hurst as Jules 
Doris Brook as Lila Landau
Syd Saylor as Mora 
Dick Curtis as Jacques 
Nelson McDowell as Mac 
Kernan Cripps as Inspector Logan

References

External links
 

1935 films
American adventure films
1935 adventure films
Films based on works by James Oliver Curwood
American black-and-white films
1930s English-language films
1930s American films
English-language adventure films